Coleophora kabulensis is a moth of the family Coleophoridae. It is found in Afghanistan and Pakistan.

References

kabulensis
Fauna of Afghanistan
Moths described in 1994
Moths of Asia